Manuela Pizzo (born 13 November 1991) is an Argentine handball player for BM Bera Bera and the Argentina women's national handball team.

She defended Argentina at the World Women's Handball Championships Brazil 2011 and Serbia 2013.

Individual awards
2017 Pan American Women's Handball Championship: All Star Team left back

References

External links

1991 births
Living people
Argentine female handball players
Argentine people of Italian descent
Handball players at the 2016 Summer Olympics
Olympic handball players of Argentina
Pan American Games medalists in handball
Pan American Games silver medalists for Argentina
Handball players at the 2011 Pan American Games
Handball players at the 2015 Pan American Games
Handball players at the 2019 Pan American Games
Expatriate handball players
Argentine expatriate sportspeople in Spain
Sportspeople from Buenos Aires
South American Games silver medalists for Argentina
South American Games medalists in handball
Competitors at the 2018 South American Games
Medalists at the 2015 Pan American Games
Medalists at the 2019 Pan American Games
Medalists at the 2011 Pan American Games
20th-century Argentine women
21st-century Argentine women